This is the list of episodes for the Japanese anime television series Simoun. It was directed by Junji Nishimura and consisted of 26 episodes which were broadcast in Japan from April 4 to September 26, 2006. Background music was composed by Toshihiko Sahashi with the OP Utsukushikereba Sore de Ii sung by Chiaki Ishikawa and the ED Inori no Uta sung by Savage Genius. The anime is science fiction, taking place in Daikūriku, and follows the pilots of the mysterious simoun. These pilots are unique as they can only fly if they have not yet chosen their gender, although they appear female. The storyline follows the war they are involved in against the other nations, the mystery behind the simoun, and the complex, often romantic relationships of the young pilots.

Episode list
{|class="wikitable" style="width:98%; margin:auto; background:#FFF;"
|- style="border-bottom: 3px solid #CCF;"
! style="width:4em;"  | 
! Title
! style="width:12em;" | Original air date
|-

{{Episode list
| EpisodeNumber       = 08
| Title               = Prayer
| TranslitTitle       = Inori
| NativeTitle         = 祈り
| NativeTitleLangCode = ja 
| OriginalAirDate     = 
| ShortSummary        = Relieved of its duties, Chor Tempest is assigned to play host to one of Plumbum's priestesses during the peace conference. The foreign priestess, Anglas, gets along well with the girls of the Simoun choir, but turns out to be a suicide bomber. She destroys two thirds of the Arcus Primas Simoun wing and cripples the carrier itself. The bombing jars Neviril out of her funk. She agrees to pair with Aer, and leads Chor Tempest to save the Arcus Prima from certain destruction at the hands of a Plumbish battleship.
| LineColor           = 
}}

{{Episode list
| EpisodeNumber       = 14
| Title               = Sacrosanct
| TranslitTitle       = Okasazaru Mono
| NativeTitle         = 冒さざるもの
| NativeTitleLangCode = ja 
| OriginalAirDate     = 
| ShortSummary        = Messis''' active prosecution of the war is not matched by those in charge back at headquarters, however. Despite the discovery of a new class of heavy fighter based aboard the base ship and the possibility of an alliance between Plumbum and Argentum, Messis and Chor Tempest receive orders to passively monitor the base ship's activities rather than attacking. Dominūra takes matters into her own hands, ordering Aer and Neviril to sortie to intercept the base and conduct an armed reconnaissance of it. She also orders Wapōrif to dismantle one of the hitherto sacrosanct Simoun to learn the secret of how they work. Wapōrif is shocked at this violation of one of Simulacrum's strongest taboos, but eventually accedes. His faith is shaken when he sees nothing obviously magical or divine inside the Simoun's helical motors; they appear to be mere machines to him. Dominūra, however, is able to see something inside that Wapōrif (who, being male, has already gone to the Spring) cannot — something profoundly shocking. She has to be helped away, screaming, from the flight deck.
| LineColor           = 
}}

{{Episode list
| EpisodeNumber       = 26
| Title               = Their Portrait
| TranslitTitle       = Kanojo-tachi no Shōzō
| NativeTitle         = 彼女達の肖像
| NativeTitleLangCode = ja 
| OriginalAirDate     = 
| ShortSummary        = The Plumbish authorities send a choir of Simouns to intercept Aer and Neviril, but instead of attacking, they perform the Ri Mājon of the Morning Calm in a friendly gesture of farewell. Aer and Neviril perform the Emerald Ri Mājon, and a peaceful white light appears at its center in place of the howling vortex from the other attempts. The two vanish in a flash of light. Years after the war, the former members of Chor Tempest reflect on their lives. Scene ends with Neviril and Aer in an alternate world dancing on an abandoned Arcus Primus. Back in the past, a pair of new Simoun Sibyllae that Rimone has trained are finally ready to attempt the Emerald Ri Mājon. Dominūra is bedridden with some sort of illness, much to Rimone's dismay. The success of the Emerald Ri Mājon by Rimone's protegées reawakens a desire in Rimone to fly again. When another of the new Sibyllae pulls her aside to ask her to pair with her, Rimone turns her down. Dominūra is Rimone's pair, she explains, and she will have no other. At that moment, a Simulacran-style Simoun appears in the sky via the Emerald Ri Mājon and vanishes. "Aer!" exclaims Rimone. "Is that someone's name?" asks the Sibylla that Rimone turned down. "It's... the ultimate form of love," replies Rimone. "Yes, the ultimate love," says Dominūra, up from her bed and fully dressed. "To what sky shall we fly next?" she asks. Dominūra and Rimone embrace, and walk happily off to their Simoun to attempt the Emerald Ri Mājon again. As they walk off, the disappointed Sibylla notices sparkly gold flakes in Dominūra's wake. Yun calls out Dominūra's name as she peers into the Spring, years later.

Years pass. Plumbum and Argentum have a falling out, and a cold war develops between them. Paraietta manages an orphanage, funded by Roatreamon's family business. Alty and Kaim reconcile, and move back in with their parents. Guragief and Anubituf stay together. Morinas and Wapōrif marry and have several children. Wauf remains as the captain of the Messis, which reverts to being a freighter again in peacetime. Eliph and Morinas join the Messis crew, and as they load cargo one day, Morinas briefly catches sight of Aer and Neviril's Simoun as it fades in and out of reality. Vuraf and Floef are drafted by opposite sides for the coming war, and Vuraf comes to visit Floef on his farm by the shore of the lake where the wreck of the Arcus Prima has settled. The two part with a wish that they never meet on the battlefield, and as the sun sets, Floef catches sight of an ancient V-tailed Simoun as it appears in the sky.

In the red glow of the sunset, a record player starts up in the deserted ballroom of the wrecked Arcus Prima. Neviril and Aer dance happily in each other's arms. As they dance, the ballroom is transformed back into its old self, until the pair vanish.
| LineColor           = 
}}
|}

Distribution

 Japan 
The anime has been released on DVD in Japan by Bandai Visual. The series consists of nine DVDs, with two episodes on the first volume and three on each of the others. They are encoded for Region 2 and do not have English subtitles. A 7-disc DVD box set was released in Japan on 28 January 2011. The box set includes all 26 episodes but none of the on-disc extras or liner notes from the original DVDs. Megami Magazine released a 30-minute promotional DVD for Simoun in September 2006. The offer was limited to the first 1000 readers to mail in a coupon from the magazine. The DVD includes cast commentary and interviews, a Tsukkomi'' segment similar to that on DVD volume 8, a "voice-over" for the first installment of the Megami manga, and other promotional material.

North America 
Media Blasters announced the Region 1 license for Simoun in May 2007. Their releases are subtitled only (no English dub). The series was released in five volumes.

References

Simoun
Episodes